Live Cream (also called Live Cream, Volume 1) is a live compilation album by the British rock band Cream, released in 1970. This album comprises four live tracks recorded in 1968 and one studio track "Lawdy Mama" from 1967. The instrumental track for "Lawdy Mama" is the same as heard on "Strange Brew" with a different vocal and guitar solo by Eric Clapton.

Live Cream hit No. 15 on the Billboard 200, No. 4 on the UK Albums Chart, and No. 10 on the Finnish Album Charts.

Critical reception 
In a 1970 review, Rolling Stone magazine called Live Cream "an excellent album" and "well-recorded, controlled, and tense; the timing of the band can capture the listener with an excitement that has nothing to do with nostalgia". Paul Kresh of Stereo Review called it "a strangely uneven set of performances" highlighted by the "studio-made" "Lawdy Mama", which he called "three minutes of truly exciting music." He described the album as "disappointing jazz/rock" with excellent recording and stereo quality, particularly "superb" remixing by Adrian Barber, and felt that the longer tracks "suffer from interludes of aimlessness", but are generally "very good".

In a retrospective review, Allmusic's Bruce Eder gave Live Cream four out of five stars and said that it "could well be their most consistently brilliant album for sheer musicianship", despite only featuring songs from Cream's "least ambitious and most rudimentary album" Fresh Cream (1966). Eder found the group's interplay throughout the jams "fascinating" and asserted that "performances like this single-handedly raised the stakes of musicianship in rock." However, Robert Christgau said, despite side one's "unmistakable and attractive" intensity, he prefers "Clapton's graceful picking on Fresh Creams 'Sleepy Time Time' over the flat-out distortions here". J. D. Considine, writing in The Rolling Stone Album Guide (2004), gave it two out of five stars and wrote that both Live Cream and its second volume are "muddled leftovers released solely to cash in on the band's enduring popularity." "Ultimate Classic Rock" rated the album in the "Top 100 Live Albums", and said the album found "cool new wrinkles in the old material".

Track listing

CD version track listing
 "N.S.U." (Bruce) – 10:12
 "Sleepy Time Time" (Bruce, Godfrey) – 6:50
 "Sweet Wine" (Baker, Godfrey) – 15:15
 "Rollin' and Tumblin'" (Newbern) – 6:42
 "Lawdy Mama" (Traditional) – 2:46

Personnel
Per liner notes
Jack Bruce – bass, harmonica, vocals
Eric Clapton – guitar, vocals
Ginger Baker – drums, vocals
Felix Pappalardi – producer, except on "Lawdy Mama"
Ahmet Ertegun – producer on "Lawdy Mama"
Robert Stigwood – producer on "Lawdy Mama"
Adrian Barber – recording engineer, re-mix engineer
Tom Dowd – recording engineer
Bill Halverson – recording engineer
Stephen Paley – photography

Certifications

References

Cream (band) live albums
1970 live albums
Atco Records live albums
Polydor Records live albums
Albums produced by Ahmet Ertegun
Albums produced by Felix Pappalardi
Albums produced by Robert Stigwood